Korha may refer to:

 Kora, Katihar, a town and  tehsil in the India state of Bihar, also spelled Korha 
 Korha, Bagalpur 
 Korha (Vidhan Sabha constituency), a political constituency in Katihar, Bihar, India

See also
Kora (disambiguation)
Kohra